Amina Adil (c. 1930 – 16 November 2004) was a Tatar writer and Islamic theologian.

Biography 
Amina was born as one of four children in an Islamic Tataric family in Kazan, TASSR, UdSSR. Due to harassment from the Communist regime, the family fled first to Eleşkirt, and then to Erzurum in Turkey. After 10 years they migrated from there to Damascus.

Published works 
Muhammad the Messenger of Islam: His Life & Prophecy by Hajjah Amina Adil  (Jan 1, 2012)  	
Lore of Light by Hajjah Adil  (Oct 13, 2008)
My Little Lore of Light by Karima Sperling and Hajjah Amina Adil  (Feb 1, 2009)

External links
 Sheikh Nazim's Saltanat Talks
 Old Talks from Amina Adil
 Mention of Amina Adil's death

1930s births
2004 deaths
People from Larnaca
Turkish Cypriot Sunni Muslims
Cypriot Muslims
Turkish Sufis
Turkish monarchists
Turkish Cypriot writers
Soviet emigrants to Turkey